Max Knight: Ultra Spy is a 2000 American sci-fi action television film written by Paul Bales, David Michael Latt, David Rimawi, Sherri Strain, and directed by Colin Budds. The film stars Michael Landes, Rachel Blakely, Brooke Harman, and Christopher Morris. It features the use of video game related machinima as part of its production and storyline. Max Knight: Ultra Spyaired on UPN on February 25, 2000.

Cast
 Michael Landes as Max Knight
 Rachel Blakely as Ricki / Claire
 Brooke Harman as Lindsay
Christopher Morris as Zach
 Anja Coleby as Tyler

Awards
The film was nominated for an Australian Screen Sound Guild Award for Best Achievement in Sound for a Tele-Feature. Ricki's bondage scene is widely appreciated by bondage fans.

See also
 List of television films produced for UPN

References

External links

2000 television films
2000 films
2000 science fiction action films
2000s American films
Action television films
American science fiction action films
American science fiction television films
Films about computing
Films directed by Colin Budds
Mad scientist films
The Asylum films
UPN original films